Annette Catherine Dolphin (born 1951)  is a Professor of Pharmacology in the Department of Neuroscience, Physiology and Pharmacology at University College London (UCL).

Education
Dolphin was educated at the University of Oxford where she was awarded a Bachelor of Arts degree in Biochemistry in 1973, and the Institute of Psychiatry at King's College London where she was awarded a PhD in 1977 for research on noradrenaline receptors.

Career and research
Dolphin is a leader in the field of neuronal voltage-gated calcium channels. She is distinguished for her work on the regulation of calcium channel trafficking and function, and the modulation of that function by activation of G-protein coupled receptors. Her work on the control of calcium channel trafficking by auxiliary calcium channel subunits has been particularly influential. She has elucidated the topology and processing of this family of proteins.

Before working at UCL, Dolphin held appointments at the Collège de France, Yale University, the National Institute for Medical Research, St George's, University of London and the Royal Free Hospital.

Awards and honours
Dolphin has received a number awards for her research, including the British Pharmacological Society (BPS) Sandoz Prize and the Pfizer Prize in Biology. She has also been awarded prize lectures such as the G. L. Brown Prize Lecture of The Physiological Society, the Julius Axelrod Distinguished Lecture in Neuroscience of the University of Toronto, the BPS Gary Price Memorial Lecture and, most recently, the Mary Pickford Lecture of the University of Edinburgh and the Physiological Society Annual Review Prize Lecture in 2015.

She was elected a Fellow of the Academy of Medical Sciences (FMedSci) in 1999 and a Fellow of the Royal Society (FRS) in 2015.

References

Living people
Fellows of the Royal Society
Fellows of the Academy of Medical Sciences (United Kingdom)
Academics of University College London
Alumni of King's College London
British pharmacologists
British women scientists
Female Fellows of the Royal Society
Alumni of the University of Oxford
1951 births